Ulva crassa is a species of blackish-green coloured seaweed in Ulvaceae family that is endemic to New Zealand. The name comes from Latin meaning thick.

References

Further reading

Ulvaceae
Plants described in 1956
Endemic flora of New Zealand